The Hunch is a 1921 American silent comedy film directed by George D. Baker and starring Gareth Hughes, Ethel Grandin and John Steppling.

Cast
 Gareth Hughes as J. Preston Humphrey
 Ethel Grandin as Barbara Thorndyke
 John Steppling as 	John C. Thorndyke
 Edward Flanagan as George Taylor
 Harry Lorraine as Sheriff Henry Clay Greene
 Gale Henry as Minnie Stubbs
 William H. Brown as 	Hodges

References

Bibliography
 Connelly, Robert B. The Silents: Silent Feature Films, 1910-36, Volume 40, Issue 2. December Press, 1998.
 Munden, Kenneth White. The American Film Institute Catalog of Motion Pictures Produced in the United States, Part 1. University of California Press, 1997.

External links
 

1921 films
1921 comedy films
1920s English-language films
American silent feature films
Silent American comedy films
American black-and-white films
Films directed by George D. Baker
Metro Pictures films
1920s American films